Orla Noom, (born 2 November 1985 in Haarlem) is a professional squash player who represents the Netherlands. She reached a career-high world ranking of World No. 31 in November 2007.

References

External links 

1985 births
Living people
Dutch female squash players
Sportspeople from Haarlem